The French-Canadian Brigade was an intended unit in the Canadian Expeditionary Force during the First World War.

Although it was assigned a block of 3000 regimental numbers (2320301-2323300), only the first 119 were used.  Recruiting took place in Military District 10 (M.D. 10)--primarily in Manitoba, which has a sizeable French-Canadian population—in early 1917.  Approximately one-half of the recruits were born outside of Canada and represented six countries: France (18), United States of America (9), Belgium (6), Switzerland (5), England (1), Russia (1).  Of those born in Canada, the majority came from Manitoba (29) and Quebec (24); two other provinces are represented: Saskatchewan (7) and Ontario (2).  A number of the recruits were subsequently reassigned to the Canadian Forestry Corps.

Canadian World War I brigades
French Canada
History of Manitoba